In four-dimensional Euclidean geometry, the 16-cell honeycomb is one of the three regular space-filling tessellations (or honeycombs), represented by Schläfli symbol {3,3,4,3}, and constructed by a 4-dimensional packing of  16-cell facets, three around every face.

Its dual is the 24-cell honeycomb. Its vertex figure is a 24-cell. The vertex arrangement is called the B4, D4, or F4 lattice.

Alternate names
 Hexadecachoric tetracomb/honeycomb
 Demitesseractic tetracomb/honeycomb

Coordinates

Vertices can be placed at all integer coordinates (i,j,k,l), such that the sum of the coordinates is even.

D4 lattice 
The vertex arrangement of the 16-cell honeycomb is called the D4 lattice or F4 lattice. The vertices of this lattice are the centers of the 3-spheres in the densest known packing of equal spheres in 4-space; its kissing number is 24, which is also the same as the kissing number in R4, as proved by Oleg Musin in 2003.

The related D lattice (also called D) can be constructed by the union of two D4 lattices, and is identical to the C4 lattice:
 ∪  =  = 

The kissing number for D is 23 = 8, (2n – 1 for n < 8, 240 for n = 8, and 2n(n – 1) for n > 8).

The related D lattice (also called D and C) can be constructed by the union of all four D4 lattices, but it is identical to the D4 lattice: It is also the 4-dimensional body centered cubic, the union of two 4-cube honeycombs in dual positions.
 ∪  ∪  ∪  =  =  ∪ .

Symmetry constructions 

There are three different symmetry constructions of this tessellation. Each symmetry can be represented by different arrangements of colored 16-cell facets.

Related honeycombs
It is related to the regular hyperbolic 5-space 5-orthoplex honeycomb, {3,3,3,4,3}, with 5-orthoplex facets, the regular 4-polytope 24-cell, {3,4,3} with octahedral (3-orthoplex) cell, and cube {4,3}, with (2-orthoplex) square faces.

It has a 2-dimensional analogue, {3,6}, and as an alternated form (the demitesseractic honeycomb, h{4,3,3,4}) it is related to the alternated cubic honeycomb.

See also 
Regular and uniform honeycombs in 4-space:
Tesseractic honeycomb
24-cell honeycomb
Truncated 24-cell honeycomb
Snub 24-cell honeycomb
 5-cell honeycomb
 Truncated 5-cell honeycomb
 Omnitruncated 5-cell honeycomb

Notes

References 
 Coxeter, H.S.M. Regular Polytopes, (3rd edition, 1973), Dover edition, 
 pp. 154–156: Partial truncation or alternation, represented by h prefix: h{4,4} = {4,4}; h{4,3,4} = {31,1,4}, h{4,3,3,4} = {3,3,4,3}, ...
 Kaleidoscopes: Selected Writings of H.S.M. Coxeter, edited by F. Arthur Sherk, Peter McMullen, Anthony C. Thompson, Asia Ivic Weiss, Wiley-Interscience Publication, 1995,  
 (Paper 24) H.S.M. Coxeter, Regular and Semi-Regular Polytopes III, [Math. Zeit. 200 (1988) 3-45]
 George Olshevsky, Uniform Panoploid Tetracombs, Manuscript (2006) (Complete list of 11 convex uniform tilings, 28 convex uniform honeycombs, and 143 convex uniform tetracombs)
  x3o3o4o3o - hext - O104
 

Honeycombs (geometry)
5-polytopes
Regular tessellations